The Pennsylvania Treasurer election of 2016 was held on November 8, 2016. Incumbent Tim Reese was eligible to run, but decided not to. The Democratic and Republican primary election was held on April 26, 2016, with each candidate running unopposed in their respective primaries. Four candidates would appear on the ballot: Democrat Joe Torsella, Republican Otto Voit, Libertarian James Babb, and Green Party candidate Kristen Combs. Torsella defeated Voit by a 6.45% margin, with Babb and Combs both receiving under 3% of the vote.

Democratic primary

Candidates
Joe Torsella, former chair of the Pennsylvania Board of Education and Obama Administration's representative to the United Nations for budget and management reform

Results

Republican primary

Candidates
Otto Voit III, vice-president of the school board in the Muhlenberg School District in Berks County

Results

Additional Candidates

Green Party 

 Kristen Combs

Libertarian Party 

 James Babb

General election

Results

References

2016 Pennsylvania elections
State treasurers of Pennsylvania
Pennsylvania